Casey Glacier is a glacier  wide, flowing east into Casey Inlet on the east coast of Palmer Land. It was discovered by Sir Hubert Wilkins on an aerial flight of December 20, 1928. Wilkins believed the feature to be a channel cutting completely across the Antarctic Peninsula, naming it Casey Channel after Rt. Hon. Richard G. Casey. Correlation of aerial photographs taken by Lincoln Ellsworth in 1935 and preliminary reports of the British Graham Land Expedition, 1934–37, led W.L.G. Joerg to interpret this glacier to be what Wilkins named Casey Channel. This interpretation is borne out by the results of subsequent exploration by members of the East Base of the United States Antarctic Service in 1940.

See also
Hogmanay Pass

References 

Glaciers of Palmer Land